= Karonmajigi =

Community in Federal Capital Territory, Nigeria

Karonmagaji
- Village
- Karonmagaji
- Location within Nigeria
- Coordinates: 9°1′0″N 7°25′14″E
- State: Abuja
- Local Government Area 1: Abuja Municipal Area Council
- Time zone: UTC+1 (WAT)

Karonmajigi is a community located within the Federal Capital Territory FCT of Nigeria, It is near the capital of Abuja. The postal code of the village is 900108.

== Overview ==
Karonmajigi is characterized by its high ethnic diversity, often described as a Mini Nigeria were various groups, including the indigenous Gwandara, as well as Hausa, Yoroba, Igbo, and others. The community is predominantly inhabited by low-income earners and features a mix of informal housing alongside significant governmental and educational institutions.

== Geography and administration ==
The community is situated approximately 10 kilometers (about 6.2 miles) from the central area of Abuja. It falls under the administration of the Abuja Municipal Area Council (AMAC), one of the six area councils in the FCT. The FCT is administered by a minister appointed by the president of Nigeria, while the Federal Capital Development Authority (FCDA) manages infrastructure development.

== Population ==
The population of Karonmajigi is diverse, reflecting the cosmopolitan nature of the wider FCT which attractsc people from across Nigeria. While the Gwandara are a major ethnic group in the area, the community also hosts a significant population of persons with disabilities (PWDs), often referred to by locals as Unguwar Guragu (Hausa for community of disabled people).
